Daisy Siete is a seasonal drama program broadcast by GMA Network and FOCUS Entertainment Inc. in the Philippines. The drama aired from September 1, 2003, to July 2, 2010.

Daisy Siete episodes

Seasons 1 to 6

Season 7: May Bukas Pa ang Kahapon

Season 8: Tahanan

Season 9: Ang Pitong Maria

Season 10: Sayaw ng Puso

Season 11: Nasaan Ka?

Season 12: Landas

Season 13: Moshi Moshi Chikiyaki

Season 14: Siete Siete, Mano Mano

Season 15: Isla Chikita

Season 16: Tabaching-ching

Season 17: Ulingling

Season 18: Prince Charming and the Seven Maids

Season 19: Vaklushii

Season 20: Tinderella

Season 21: Tarzariray: Amasonang Kikay

Season 22: Kambalilong

Season 23: Chacha Muchacha

Season 24: My Shuper Sweet Lover

Season 25: Bebeh and Me
Daisy Siete welcomes back Rochelle Pangilinan to the 25th season of the drama anthology—through Bebe and Me

Season 26: Adam or Eve

See also 
 Daisy Siete

External links 
Daisy Siete at iGMA.tv
Daisy Siete at Telebisyon.net

Lists of soap opera episodes
Lists of Philippine drama television series episodes